Bages is a comarca (county) in Catalonia, Spain.

Bages may also refer to:
 Bages, Aude, a commune of the Aude département in France
 Bages, Pyrénées-Orientales, a commune of the Pyrénées-Orientales département in France

See also 
 Bage (disambiguation)